Ismael Al-Maghrebi (born 17 July 1991) is a Saudi Arabian football player who currently plays as a striker.

Honours
Al-Batin
MS League: 2019–20

References

External links
 

Living people
1991 births
Association football forwards
Saudi Arabian footballers
Al-Ahli Saudi FC players
Al-Wehda Club (Mecca) players
Al-Taawoun FC players
Al-Shabab FC (Riyadh) players
Ohod Club players
Al Batin FC players
Al-Bukayriyah FC players
Al-Kawkab FC players
Sportspeople from Jeddah
Saudi First Division League players
Saudi Professional League players